
Year 231 BC was a year of the pre-Julian Roman calendar. At the time it was known as the Year of the Consulship of Matho and Maso (or, less frequently, year 523 Ab urbe condita). The denomination 231 BC for this year has been used since the early medieval period, when the Anno Domini calendar era became the prevalent method in Europe for naming years.

Events 
 By place 

 Greece 
 Demetrius II, king of Macedonia, seeks military help from Agron, king of Illyria, a loosely organized state on the Adriatic coast north of Epirus, against the advancing Aetolians. The Illyrian army routs the Aetolians and returns home as the victor.

 Roman Republic 
 The Romans send envoys to Massilia (modern Marseille, France) to negotiate with the Carthaginian general Hamilcar Barca who is based there.

Births 
 Hieronymus, tyrant of Syracuse (d. 214 BC)
 Han Xin, prominent Chinese general of the early Han Dynasty is born.

Deaths 
 Agron, king of the Ardiaean Kingdom (Western Balkans)

References